Bartłomiej Pawełczak (born 7 June 1982, in Więcbork) is a Polish rower. He won a silver medal in lightweight coxless four at the 2008 Summer Olympics.

For his sport achievements, he received: 
 Golden Cross of Merit in 2008.

References 

1982 births
Living people
Polish male rowers
Olympic rowers of Poland
Rowers at the 2008 Summer Olympics
Olympic silver medalists for Poland
People from Więcbork
Olympic medalists in rowing
Medalists at the 2008 Summer Olympics
Sportspeople from Kuyavian-Pomeranian Voivodeship